Bernadette Phan (born 1966) is a Vancouver based visual artist working with painting and drawing.

Early life and education 
Phan was born in Cambodia to Vietnamese parents, and was raised in France and Canada. She received a Bachelor of Fine Arts (BFA) in Studio Arts at Concordia University in Montreal, Quebec, and a Master of Fine Arts (MFA) in Printmaking at Temple University in Philadelphia, Pennsylvania.

Works 
Ovalicity, 2004

Ovalicity is a series of paintings engaging with oval shaped marks depicted across the work's "painterly, atmospheric surfaces."

Trippy Ethers, 2009 
Trippy Ethers is a series of painting moving away from expressive marks of shapes, and utilizing strokes to create small marks of paint, ranging over the canvas. There is no accumulating image that rises out of the painted surface, but instead the sense of space and dimension is formed in the viewer's mind. Trippy Ethers can be understood as an attempt to reverse the contemporary conditions of information overload. Kelowna Art Gallery describes Phan's series as being "not monotonous...," but as "rich, meditative, contemplative works that invoke a quietude within the viewer".

Exhibitions

Solo exhibitions 

 Bernadette Phan, Syntax Gallery at the International Centre of Arts and Technology, Vancouver, British Columbia, 2017
 Float, Equinox Gallery, Vancouver, British Columbia, 2003

Group exhibitions 

 Lili and the Migratory Influences, Burnaby Public Library, Burnaby, British Columbia, 2015
 The Point Is, Kelowna Art Gallery, Kelowna, British Columbia, 2011
 Fantastic, Centre A, Vancouver, British Columbia, 2007
 Some New Paintings: Bernadette Phan, Philippe Raphanel, Ben Reeves, Equinox Gallery, Vancouver, British Columbia, 2002

References 

Living people
1966 births
Artists of Vietnamese descent
Artists from Vancouver
Concordia University alumni
Temple University alumni
21st-century Canadian painters
21st-century Canadian women artists
Vietnamese painters
Cambodian women artists
Canadian people of Vietnamese descent